The 1977–78 FIBA European Champions Cup was the 21st season of the European top-tier level professional basketball club competition FIBA European Champions Cup (now called EuroLeague). The Final was held at the Olympiahalle, in Munich, West Germany, on April 6, 1978. Real Madrid defeated Mobilgirgi Varese, by a result of 75–67; both teams qualified for 1978 FIBA Intercontinental Cup.

Competition system

 19 teams total (European national domestic league champions, plus the then current title holders), playing in a tournament system. 18 teams (domestic champions) entered a Quarterfinals group stage, divided into five groups and played a round-robin. The final standing was based on individual wins and defeats. In the case of a tie between two or more teams after the group stage, the following criteria were used to decide the final classification: 1) number of wins in one-to-one games between the teams; 2) basket average between the teams; 3) general basket average within the group
 The 5 group winners of the quarterfinals group stage, together with the title holders, advanced to the semifinals group stage, which was played as a single group under the same round-robin rules.
 The group winner and the runner-up of the semifinal group stage qualified for the final, which was played at a predetermined venue.

Quarterfinals group stage

Group E

Automatically qualified to the semifinals group stage
 Maccabi Elite Tel Aviv (title holder)

Semifinals group stage

Final
April 6, Olympiahalle, Munich

|}

Awards

FIBA European Champions Cup Finals Top Scorer
 Walter Szczerbiak Sr. ( Real Madrid)

References

External links
1977–78 FIBA European Champions Cup
 1977–78 FIBA European Champions Cup
 Champions Cup 1977–78 Line-ups and Stats

EuroLeague seasons
FIBA